Flisy is a district in Bydgoszcz, Poland, west of the city, above the Bydgoszcz Canal. 

Flisy
Neighbourhoods in Bydgoszcz